Johannes Paludan (1912-2001) was a Danish architect.

Biography
Paludan was the son of a prominent developer in Viborg, and graduated from the Royal Danish Academy of Fine Arts in Copenhagen in 1938 after having completed a degree as a constructor in Århus.

In 1942, during the occupation of Denmark, he established an architectural practice in Virum north of Copenhagen. In the following decades he left a stamp on buildings in contiguously built-up urban areas of Copenhagen. He was behind the highrise blocks on Sorgenfrivang, the single-family houses on Klosterbakken and the renovation of Virum School among others.

Danish architects
1912 births
2001 deaths
Royal Danish Academy of Fine Arts alumni